Never Ending Neverland is a South Korean reality show starring Cube Entertainment's third girl group (G)I-dle on their journey to rescue Neverland from Captain Hook's curses.

Background and concept
On July 1, 2020, Cube Tv announced that it will launch an entertainment program, Never Ending Neverland as part of their 5th anniversary.
The show follows the storyline of Peter Pan with a curse placed on the fantasy nation of Neverland by Captain Hook, where (G)I-dle will follow various missions in the story. The group will showcase their various skills through challengers including impression, fashion styling and cooking.

Contents
A Never Book helps (G)I-dle to solve Captain Hook's curses. After every mission they receive a card to open the eternity gate to Neverland.

Captain Hook's 6 Curses
Curse 1 - A Phonograph that lost melodies
Curse 2 - The lamp that lost light
Curse 3 - Little Prince who lost his crown
Curse 4 - A clown who lost his ball
Curse 5 - A knight who lost his sword
Curse 6 - A fountain that lost water

Mission Rooms
 Mission 1 - Movie
 Mission 2 - Training/styling room
 Mission 3 - Camping site
 Mission 4 - Sleep room
 Mission 5 - Courage room
 Mission 6 - Singing room

Rules
Pizza Timing game - In episode 2, each member chooses one hidden ingredient and make pizza by using all 6 selected ingredients
Miyeon's kimchi fried rice - In episode 2, Miyeon have to cook kimchi fried rice in 15 minutes depending on the members' orders. 
4-letter Word Game - In episode 3, each member have to complete the 4 letter words within 40 seconds.
Candlelight - In episode 3, the challenger used a water gun to put out the candlelight while in swing motion. They were given 3 chances.
 SNS LIVE Singing - In episode 4, the fans were given 5 songs to vote for the song they want (G)I-dle to sing. They will sing 3 songs the fans choose and score 290 points.
 Cosmetic CF Game - In episode 5, each member chooses one cosmetic product to advertise on a non-commercial film. The winner get to choose which bed to sleep and assigned members' bed.

Clues
 Mission 1 - You can see by closing the left eye.
 Mission 2 - Check the inner heart of the giant.
 Mission 3 - Clear the green beard away.
 Mission 4 - The foot of the lamp is dark.
 Mission 5 - If you want to get a star, look up in the sky.
 Mission 6 - The card was given.

Cast

Members
 Miyeon as herself
 Minnie as herself
 Soojin as herself
 Soyeon as herself
 Yuqi as herself
 Shuhua as herself

Guest
 Kim Bo-min as the narrator (Episode 1)
 Jeon A-ram, an aerial silk instructor (Episode 3)
 Hyemin, a Beauty Wanghong's media influencer in China (Episode 5)

Episodes
Note: The episodes aired live on Cube Tv at 4:30 pm KST.
Note 2: Every episode is re-upload into two parts with English subtitles on (G)I-dle's official Youtube channel at 5pm KST on the same day.
Note 3: Exclusive behind the scenes footage only on Cube Tv. The behind-the-scenes will not be uploaded on the group's Youtube channel.

Production Notes
Adapted from the closing credits
 Planned by iHQ and Cube TV
 Produced by Cube Entertainment and KVLY
 Sponsored by VT Cosmetics.

References

External links

South Korean reality television series
2020 South Korean television series debuts
2020 South Korean television series endings
Korean-language television shows
Television series based on singers and musicians
(G)I-dle